The English language surname Hawkins is said by FaNUK (Dictionary of Family Names in Britain and Ireland) to have three possible origins.

The most usual origin is the forename Hawkin with an original genitival -s (that is, "Hawkin's son") (or else it is Hawkin used as a surname with a later excrescent -s in the early modern period to bring it into line with the predominant style of hereditary surnames with such a genitival -s).

It is one of many personal names with the diminutive Middle English suffix -kin (originally from Low German or Dutch) added to a single-syllable hypocoristic form, such as Robert > Hob > Hopkin, Walter > Wat > Watkin, or William > Will > Wilkin.  The Middle English personal name Haw is a rhyming fond form of Raw, that is, Ralph.

Another possible origin is the placename Hawkinge, near Folkestone, in Kent, England. This was written as Hauekinge in 1204, based on Old English heafoc (hawk), or more likely this same word used as a personal name. A final 'ng' was (and is) simplified to 'n' in English generally; the final -s would be the excrescent -s added to the locative surname in the belief that it was the personal name Hawkin.

In Ireland, Hawkins may be the result of Anglicising a native surname: it was used as a substitute for Ó hEacháin ‘descendant of Eachán' (= little Eachaidh, i.e. a pet form of the personal name Eachaidh meaning ‘horseman’), as it had a vague similarity in sound to the Irish name.

In Scotland, the given name Eachann has two elements. The first element is each, meaning "horse". The second element is donn, which has been given two meanings. One proposed meaning is "brown"; the other is "lord". The early Gaelic form of the name, Eachdonn, was confused with the Norse Hakon (which is etymologically unrelated). Hawkins and a derivative, Howkins, are a sept of Clan Stewart of Lennox and of Clan Guthrie.

People

A to D 
Adelaide Hawkins (1914–2008), American cryptologist
Alex Hawkins (1937–2017), American football player and sportscaster
Alfred Hawkins (footballer), (1904 – unknown) English association footballer
Alice Hawkins (1863–1946), leading English suffragette
Andy Hawkins (disambiguation), several people
Anthony Hawkins (1932–2013), Australian actor
Armis E. Hawkins (1920–2006), associate justice of the Supreme Court of Mississippi
Augustus Hawkins (1907–2007), American politician, author of the Humphrey-Hawkins Full Employment Act
Barry Hawkins (born 1979), English snooker player
Ben Hawkins (American football) (born 1944), American football player
Benjamin Hawkins (1754–1816), American farmer, statesman, and delegate to the Native American Creek people
Brad Hawkins (disambiguation), multiple people
Buddy Boy Hawkins, American country blues guitarist, singer, and songwriter 
C. R. Hawkins (1900–1959), American politician, Missouri senator
Charlotte Hawkins (born 1975), English television and radio presenter, newsreader and journalist
Chauncey Lamont Hawkins or Amir Junaid Muhadith (born 1975), American rapper, better known as Loon
Chris Hawkins (born 1975), English DJ and radio presenter
Chris Hawkins (American football) (born 1982)
Christopher Hawkins (disambiguation), several people
Clifford Frank Hawkins (1915–1991), British physician
Coleman Hawkins (1904–1969), American jazz tenor saxophonist
Connie Hawkins (1942–2017), American basketball player
Corey Hawkins (basketball) (born 1991), American basketball player
Curt Hawkins (born 1985), American professional wrestler
D. J. B. Hawkins (1906–1964), British philosopher and priest
Dale Hawkins (1936–2010), American singer and songwriter
Dan Hawkins (disambiguation), several people
Darrell Hawkins (born 1969), American basketball coach and player
David Hawkins (disambiguation), several people
Dennis Hawkins (born 1947) English association footballer
Donald Hawkins (born 1992), American football player

E to K 
Edward Hawkins (1789–1882), English academic, Provost of Oriel College, Oxford
Edward Hawkins (New York politician) (1829–1908), New York politician
Edwin Hawkins (1943–2018), American singer and songwriter
Erick Hawkins (1909–1994), modern dancer
Ernie Hawkins (born 1947), American blues guitarist and singer
Erskine Hawkins (1914–1993), American trumpet player and big band leader
Etta Hawkins (1865–1945), American stage actress
Francesca Hawkins (fl. 1980s–2020s), Trinidadian television news presenter
Geoffrey Hawkins (1895–1980), Royal Navy officer
Georgann Hawkins (1955–1974), American murder victim of Ted Bundy
George Hawkins (disambiguation), several people
Gerald Hawkins (1928–2003), American-British astronomer
Gerald Hawkins (politician) (1943–2015), American politician
Greg Hawkins (fl. 1970s–2000s), American hedge-fund trader
Gregory P. Hawkins (born 1957), American lawyer, speaker, and writer
Hamilton S. Hawkins (1834–1910), American general
Hawkshaw Hawkins (1921–1963), American country and western singer
Henry Hawkins, 1st Baron Brampton (1817–1907), English judge
Henry Hawkins (politician) (1790–1845), New York politician
Hersey Hawkins (born 1966), American professional basketball player
Howie Hawkins (born 1952), Green Party nominee in 2020 US presidential election
Jack Hawkins (disambiguation), several people
James Hawkins (disambiguation), several people
Javian Hawkins (born 1999), American football player
Jaylinn Hawkins (born 1997), American football player
Jeff Hawkins (born 1957), American scientist
Jeffrey Hawkins (born 1966), American diplomat and ambassador
Jennifer Hawkins (born 1983), Australian model and Miss Universe 2004
Jim Hawkins (radio presenter) (born 1962), English radio presenter
John Hawkins (disambiguation), several people
Jonathan Hawkins (born 1983), British chess grandmaster
Joyce Hawkins (died 1992), English lexicographer and dictionary editor
Justin Hawkins (born 1975), English rock musician
Keith Hawkins (born 1967), English poker player
Kyle Hawkins (born 1970), American lacrosse coach

L to R 
LaTroy Hawkins, (born 1972), baseball player
Margaret Hawkins (1877–1969), American teacher and activist
Mary Ellen Hawkins (1923-2023), American politician
Matt Hawkins (born 1983), South African rugby player who played for the United States
Matthew Hawkins (born 1982), American mountain biker
Nehemiah Hawkins, (1833–1928), American writer and publisher
Paul Hawkins (disambiguation), several people
Paula Hawkins (politician) (1927–2009), American politician
Petri Hawkins-Byrd, bailiff "Byrd" on the Judge Judy TV series
Rachel Hawkins (born 1992), Scottish cricketer
Rachel Hawkins (writer) (born 1979), American author
Rebecca Hawkins (disambiguation), several people
Richard Hawkins (disambiguation), several people
Rob Hawkins (born 1983), English rugby union player
Robert Hawkins (disambiguation), several people
Ronnie Hawkins (1935–2022), American rock singer and songwriter
Rush Hawkins (1831–1920), American Civil War colonel and politician

S to Z 
Sally Hawkins (born 1976), British actress
Screamin' Jay Hawkins (1929–2000), American singer and entertainer
Simeon S. Hawkins (1827–1908), New York politician
Sophie B. Hawkins (born 1967), American singer and songwriter
Stewart J. Hawkins (born c. 1935), British scouting leader
Taylor Hawkins (1972–2022), American musician
Tianna Hawkins (born 1991), American basketball player
Tim Hawkins (born 1975), American Christian comedian
Thomas Hawkins (disambiguation), several people called Thomas or Tom
Walter Lincoln Hawkins (1911–1992), American scientist and inventor
William Hawkins (disambiguation) , several people
Wynn Hawkins (1936–2021), American Major League Baseball pitcher

References

External links 
 Hawkins Worldwide DNA Project (with information on the Hawkins surname)

English-language surnames
Occupational surnames

ru:Хокинс